The 1816 United States presidential election was the eighth quadrennial presidential election. It was held from November 1 to December 4, 1816. In the first election following the end of the War of 1812, Democratic-Republican candidate James Monroe defeated Federalist Rufus King. The election was the last in which the Federalist Party fielded a presidential candidate.

As President James Madison chose to retire after serving two terms, the Democratic-Republicans held a congressional nominating caucus in March 1816. With the support of Madison and former President Thomas Jefferson, Secretary of State Monroe defeated Secretary of War William H. Crawford to win his party's presidential nomination. Governor Daniel D. Tompkins of New York won the Democratic-Republican vice presidential nomination, continuing the party's tradition of balancing a presidential nominee from Virginia with a vice presidential nominee from either New York or New England. The Federalists did not formally nominate a ticket, but Senator King of New York emerged as the de facto Federalist candidate.

The previous four years of American politics were dominated by the effects of the War of 1812. Its drawn outcome and the peace concluded in 1815 were satisfactory to the American people, and the Democratic-Republicans received credit for the results. Federalists were discredited by having opposed the war and by radical rhetoric from New England Federalists at the Hartford Convention. Also, President Madison had adopted certain measures favored by Federalists, including a national bank and protective tariffs. The Federalists had little to campaign on, and Monroe easily won the Electoral College, carrying 16 of the 19 states.

Nominations

Democratic-Republican Party nomination

Withdrew before caucus

Declined to run

James Monroe was the favorite candidate of both former President Jefferson and retiring President Madison. However, Monroe faced stiff competition from Secretary of War William H. Crawford of Georgia. Also, there was widespread sentiment, especially in New York, that it was time to end the Virginia dynasty of presidents, resulting in Daniel D. Tompkins and Simon Snyder, the governors of New York and Pennsylvania respectively, briefly considering running for the presidential nomination. But Monroe's long record of service at home and abroad made him a fitting candidate to succeed Madison. Crawford never formally declared himself a candidate, because he believed that he had little chance against Monroe and feared such a contest might deny him a place in the new cabinet. Tompkins and Snyder realized they had even less chance of beating Monroe to the nomination, and instead positioned themselves to run for the vice presidency. Still, Crawford's supporters posed a significant challenge to Monroe.

Fifty-eight of the Democratic-Republican members of the United States Congress attended the first nominating caucus. A second caucus in March 1816 was attended by one hundred nineteen members of Congress. Monroe won the presidential nomination against Crawford by a vote of sixty-five to fifty-four while Tompkins won the vice-presidential nomination against Snyder by a vote of eighty-five to thirty.

Federalist Party candidates 

In hopes of uniting with disaffected Democratic-Republicans, as they had in the previous election, the Federalists initially planned to hold their own congressional nominating caucus after that of the Democratic-Republicans. With the end of the war and the nomination of Monroe, the Federalists abandoned their hopes of another fusion ticket, and the demoralized party failed to formally nominate a candidate. Senator Rufus King of New York, who had been the party's 1804 and 1808 vice presidential nominee, and who had been nominated for president by a dissident faction of the party in 1812, eventually emerged as the de facto Federalist presidential nominee. Several Federalists would receive electoral votes for vice president, with former Senator John Eager Howard of Maryland receiving the most votes. The Federalists did not formally select a vice-presidential candidate.

General election

Dispute about Indiana 
On February 12, 1817, the House and Senate met in joint session to count the electoral votes for president and vice president. The count proceeded without incident until the roll came to the last state to be counted, Indiana. At that point, Representative John W. Taylor of New York objected to the counting of Indiana's votes. He argued that Congress had acknowledged the statehood of Indiana in a joint resolution on December 11, 1816, whereas the ballots of the Electoral College had been cast on December 4, 1816. He claimed that at the time of the balloting, there had been merely a Territory of Indiana, not a State of Indiana. Other representatives contradicted Taylor, asserting that the joint resolution merely recognized that Indiana had already joined the Union by forming a state constitution and government on June 29, 1816. These representatives pointed out that both the House and Senate had seated members from Indiana who had been elected prior to the joint resolution, which would have been unconstitutional had Indiana not been a state at the time of their election. Representative Samuel D. Ingham then moved that the question be postponed indefinitely. The House agreed almost unanimously, and the Senate was brought back in to count the electoral votes from Indiana.  The issue had no bearing on the final result.

Results 

When the votes were counted, Monroe had won all but three of the nineteen states. King thought that a Monroe victory was inevitable, and did not seriously contest the election.

Each of the three states that were won by King voted for a different person for vice president. Massachusetts electors voted for former United States Senator (and future Governor) John Eager Howard of Maryland. Delaware chose a different Marylander, sitting United States Senator Robert Goodloe Harper. Connecticut split its vote between James Ross of Pennsylvania and Chief Justice John Marshall.

Maryland did not choose its electors as a slate; rather, it divided itself into electoral districts, with each district choosing one elector. Three of Maryland's eleven districts were won by Federalist electors. However, these electors did not vote for King or for a Federalist vice president, instead casting blank votes as a protest.

Source (Popular Vote): A New Nation Votes: American Election Returns 1787-1825(a) Only 10 of the 19 states chose electors by popular vote. 
(b) Those states that did choose electors by popular vote had widely varying restrictions on suffrage via property requirements. 
(c) One Elector from Delaware and three Electors from Maryland did not vote. Results by state 
Elections in this period were vastly different from modern day Presidential elections. The actual Presidential candidates were rarely mentioned on tickets and voters were voting for particular electors who were pledged to a particular candidate. There was sometimes confusion as to who the particular elector was actually pledged to. Results are reported as the highest result for an elector for any given candidate. For example, if three Monroe electors received 100, 50, and 25 votes, Monroe would be recorded as having 100 votes. Confusion surrounding the way results are reported may lead to discrepancies between the sum of all state results and national results.

The Federalist parties of New Jersey, Rhode Island, and Virginia did not provide a slate of electors, and as such Monroe was virtually unopposed in these states (though trivial Federalist electors received a handful of votes in New Jersey and Virginia).

Tennessee cast votes but they have been lost to time.

 States where the margin of victory was under 10% 
 New Hampshire, 6.60% (1,887 votes)

 Electoral college selection 

See also
 First inauguration of James Monroe
 History of the United States (1789-1849)
 1816–17 United States House of Representatives elections
 1816–17 United States Senate elections

References

Works cited
 U.S. Congressional Documents
 30 Annals of Cong.'' 944–949 (1817)
 Act of April 19, 1816, ch. 57, 3 Stat. 289
 Resolution of December 11, 1816, res. 1, 3 Stat. 399
 Books
 
 Web
 
 
Source (Electoral Vote):

External links

 Presidential Elections of 1816 and 1820: A Resource Guide from the Library of Congress
 A New Nation Votes: American Election Returns, 1787-1825
 Election of 1816 in Counting the Votes 

 
Presidency of James Monroe
James Monroe